Jemmapes was a late 100-gun Hercule-class ship of the line of the French Navy.

Service history
Ordered in 1824 as Indomptable and soon renamed Royal Charles, Jemmapes was laid down in 1825 but not completed before 1840. She took her definitive name after the July Revolution, on 9 August 1830.

In 1844, Jemmapes took part in the Bombardment of Mogador in Joinville's squadron. In October or November 1848, she was driven ashore at Civitavecchia, Papal States. Deactivated in 1851, she took part in the Crimean War, first in the Baltic Sea in 1854, and in the Black Sea the next year.

Decommissioned in 1864, Jemmapes was first used as a transport, and then hulked, before being scrapped in 1890.

Notes, citations, and references

Notes

Citations

References

 100-guns ships of the line

Ships of the line of the French Navy
1840 ships
Hercule-class ships of the line
Victorian-era ships of the line
Crimean War naval ships of France
Maritime incidents in 1848